The 2011–12 Beşiktaş J.K. season was the club's 108th year of existence and their 54th consecutive year in the Süper Lig. Beşiktaş were the defending champions of the Turkish Cup and participated in the group stage. The team also competed in the UEFA Europa League for a second consecutive year after being eliminated by Dynamo Kyiv in the round of 32 the previous year.

Match results

Legend

Pre-season friendlies

Süper Lig

September

Championship group

Turkish Cup

UEFA Europa League
By winning the Turkish Cup last year, Beşiktaş qualified for the 2011–12 UEFA Europa League, entering in the play-off round. After defeating Alania Vladikavkaz on aggregate, Beşiktaş was seeded in Group E, along with Stoke City, Dynamo Kyiv and Maccabi Tel Aviv

Play-off Round

Beşiktaş won 3–2 on aggregate

Group stage

Round of 32

Beşiktaş won 2–1 on aggregate

Round of 16

Beşiktaş lost 6–1 on aggregate

Squad statistics
Appearances for competitive matches only

Transfers

In 

Total spending:  €16,150,000

Out 

Total income:  €1,150,000

References

Beşiktaş J.K. seasons
Besiktas Jk
Besiktas